Elijah (meaning "My God is Yahweh/YHWH") is a masculine given name after the prophet Elijah in the Hebrew Bible.

Usage
Elijah was among the five most popular names for Black newborn boys in the American state of Virginia in 2022.

Notable people with the given name "Elijah" include

A
Elijah Abel (1808–1884), American religious figure
Elijah Abina (born 1935), Nigerian pastor
Elijah Amoo Addo (born 1990), Ghanaian chef
Elijah Adebayo (born 1998), English footballer
Elijah Adekugbe (born 1996), English footballer
Elijah Adlow (1896–1982), American politician
Elijah Omolo Agar, Kenyan politician
Elijah Alejo (born 2004), Filipino actress
Elijah Malok Aleng (1937–2014), South Sudanese politician
Elijah Alfandari, Turkish rabbi
Elijah Alick (born 1996), Australian rugby league footballer
Elijah Allan-Blitz (born 1987), American actor
Elijah Blue Allman (born 1976), American singer
Elijah Allsopp (1877–1958), English footballer
Elijah Anderson (disambiguation), multiple people
Elijah Ari (born 1987), Ghanaian-Kyrgyz footballer
Elijah Ateka (born 1972), Kenyan professor
Elijah Ayolabi, Nigerian geophysicist

B
Elijah Babbitt (1795–1887), American politician
Elijah W. Bacon (1836–1864), American soldier
Elijah Baker (born 1991), English actor
Elijah Baldwin, American politician
Elijah Barayi (1930–1994), South African trade unionist
Elijah Porter Barrows (1807–1888), American clergyman
Elijah Bashyazi (1420–1490), Turkish mathematician
Elijah Behnke (born 1983), American politician
Elijah Benamozegh (1823–1900), Italian rabbi
Elijah Bentley, Canadian minister
Elijah Benton (born 1996), American football player
Elijah Boardman (1760–1823), American politician
Elijah Boothe, American actor
Elijah Coleman Bridgman (1801–1861), American missionary
Elijah A. Briggs (1843–1922), American soldier
Elijah Brigham (1751–1816), American politician
Elijah Bristow (1788–1872), American settler
Elijah V. Brookshire (1856–1936), American politician
Elijah Brown, Canadian dancer
Elijah Brush (1773–1813), American lawyer and politician
Elijah Bryant (born 1995), American basketball player
Elijah Burke (born 1978), American wrestler

C
Elijah Cadman (1843–1927), American religious figure
Elijah Campbell (born 1995), American football player
Elijah Canlas (born 2000), Filipino actor
Elijah Capsali (1485–1550), Turkish mathematician
Elijah Carey (1876–1916), New Zealand trade unionist
Elijah Carrington (1914–1998), English cricketer
Elijah ben Joseph Chabillo, Spanish philosopher
Elijah Webb Chastain (1813–1874), American politician
Elijah Childs (born 1999), American basketball player
Elijah Churchill (1755–1841), American general
Elijah Clarance (born 1998), Swedish basketball player
Elijah Clarke (1742–1799), American military officer
Elijah Clarke (fighter), American kickboxer
Elijah Cobb (1769–1848), American captain
Elijah Combs (1770–1855), American politician
Elijah Connor (born 1990), American singer-songwriter
Elijah Cook (1835–??), American slave
Elijah Fox Cook (1805–1886), American politician
Elijah Corlet (1610–1687), English schoolmaster
Elijah Albert Cox (1876–1955), British painter
Elijah Craig (1738–1808), American preacher
Elijah Crane (1754–1834), American farmer
Elijah Cresswell (1889–1931), Scottish footballer
Elijah Cummings (1951–2019), American politician

D
Elijah Daniel (born 1994), American comedian
Elijah Dart (1880–1954), English footballer
Elijah L. Daughtridge (1863–1921), American politician
Elijah Dixon (1790–1876), English businessman
Elijah Dixon-Bonner (born 2001), English footballer
Elijah Dukes (born 1984), American baseball player

E
Elijah Easton (1815–1905), American farmer
Elijah Erkloo, Canadian politician

F
Elijah Fenton (1683–1730), English poet
Elijah Fields (born 1988), American football player
Elijah Fisher (born 2004), Canadian basketball player
Elijah Fletcher (1789–1858), American businessman

G
Elijah Garcia (born 1998), American football player
Elijah Gates (1827–1915), American politician
Elijah ben Moses Gershon Zahalon, Polish mathematician
Elijah M. K. Glenn (1807–1870), American politician
Elijah S. Grammer (1868–1936), American businessman and politician
Elijah Dix Green (1799–1867), American merchant

H
Elijah Haahr (born 1982), American politician
Elijah Haines (1822–1889), American politician
Elijah Hall (athlete) (born 1994), American sprinter
Elijah Hallam (1848–1922), British miner
Elijah Hamlin (1800–1872), American politician
Elijah Harper (1949–2013), Canadian politician
Elijah Carson Hart (1857–1929), American attorney
Elijah Hayward (1786–1864), American lawyer
Elijah ben Menahem HaZaken (980–1060), French poet
Elijah Hedding (1780–1852), American bishop
Elijah Hicks (born 1999), American football player
Elijah Higgins (born 2000), American football player
Elijah Hirsh (born 1997), American-Israeli basketball player
Elijah Hise (1802–1867), American diplomat
Elijah Hollands (born 2002), Australian rules footballer
Elijah Holyfield (born 1998), American football player
Elijah Hood (born 1996), American football player
Elijah Hoole (1798–1872), English missionary
Elijah Hoole (architect) (1837–1912), English architect
Elijah Horowitz-Winograd (1842–1878), Polish-Belarusian rabbi
Elijah Embree Hoss (1849–1919), American bishop
Elijah Howarth (1858–1938), English curator
Elijah Hughes (born 1998), American basketball player
Elijah Baldwin Huntington (1816–1877), American minister
Elijah C. Hutchinson (1855–1932), American politician

I
Elijah Iles (1796–1883), American businessman
Elijah Isaacs (1730–1799), American farmer

J
Elijah Johnson (disambiguation), multiple people
Elijah Jones (1882–1943), American baseball player
Elijah Joy (born 1982), American singer
Elijah Juckett (1760–1939), American soldier
Elijah Just (born 2000), New Zealand footballer

K
Elijah Kelley (born 1986), American actor
Elijah Kellogg (1813–1901), American minister
Elijah Kemboi (born 1984), Kenyan runner
Elijah Kipterege (born 1987), Kenyan runner
Elijah Krahn (born 2003), German footballer

L
Elijah Lagat (born 1966), Kenyan runner
Elijah Landsofer (??–1702), Czech rabbi
Elijah Lee (born 1996), American football player
Elijah Leonard (1814–1891), Canadian businessman
Elijah B. Lewis (1854–1920), American politician
Elijah Lidonde, Kenyan footballer
Elijah Litana (born 1970), Zambian footballer
Elijah Loans (1555–1636), German rabbi
Elijah Parish Lovejoy (1802–1837), American religious figure

M

Elijah 'Tap Tap' Makhatini (born 1942), South African boxer
Elijah Manangoi (born 1993), Kenyan runner
Elijah P. Marrs (1840–1910), American minister
Elijah Martin (born 1996), American soccer player
Elijah Martindale (1793–1874), American pioneer
Elijah Masinde (1910/1912–1987), Kenyan activist
Elijah McCall (born 1988), American boxer
Elijah McClain (1996–2019), American social figure
Elijah McClanahan (1770–1857), American soldier
Elijah McCoy (1844–1929), Canadian-American inventor
Elijah M. McGee (1819–1873), American politician
Elijah McGuire (born 1994), American football player
Elijah Mckenzie-Jackson (born 2003), British activist
Elijah Mdolomba, South African politician
Elijah Miles (1753–1831), Canadian farmer
Elijah Miller (1772–1851), American judge
Elijah Millgram (born 1958), American philosopher
Elijah H. Mills (1776–1829), American politician
Elijah Millsap (born 1987), American basketball player
Elijah Mitchell (born 1998), American football player
Elijah Mitchell (soccer) (born 2003), Bahamian footballer
Elijah Mitrou-Long (born 1996), Canadian basketball player
Elijah Mizrachi (1455–1525/1526), Turkish mathematician
Elijah Molden (born 1999), American football player
Elijah Montalto (1567–1616), French physician
Elijah Moore (born 2000), American football player
Elijah A. Morse (1841–1898), American politician
Elijah Moshinsky (1946–2021), Australian opera director
Elijah Moulton (1820–1902), American settler
Elijah Doro Muala (born 1960), Solomon Islander politician
Elijah Mudenda (1927–2008), Zambian politician
Elijah Muhammad (1897–1975), American religious leader
Elijah Mushemeza (born 1964), Ugandan academic
Elijah Mwangale (1939–2004), Kenyan politician
Elijah E. Myers (1832–1909), American architect

N
Elijah Nevett (born 1944), American football player
Elijah Ngurare (born 1970), Namibian politician
Elijah Niko (born 1990), New Zealand rugby union footballer
Elijah Nkala (born 1964), Zimbabwean sprinter
Elijah Nkansah (born 1994), American football player
Elijah Hise Norton (1821–1914), American politician

O
Elijah Obade (born 1991), American-Lebanese basketball player
Elijah B. Odom (1859–1924), American physician
Elijah Akpan Okon (1913–??), Nigerian chief
Elijah Olaniyi (born 1999), American basketball player

P
Elijah Paine (1757–1842), American politician
Elijah Parish (1762–1825), American clergyman
Elijah F. Pennypacker (1804–1888), American abolitionist
Elijah Phillips (1809–1832), American settler
Elijah Phister (1822–1887), American politician
Elijah Pierce (1892–1984), American wood carver
Elijah Pierson (1786–1834), American businessman
Elijah Pitts (1938–1998), American football player and coach
Elijah Barrett Prettyman (1830–1907), American academic administrator
Elijah Pyle (1918–2009), English footballer

Q
Elijah Qualls (born 1995), American football player

R
Elijah W. Reed (1827–1888), American fisherman
Elijah Reichlin-Melnick (born 1984), American politician
Elijah Rhoades (1791–1858), American politician
Elijah Riley (born 1998), American football player
Elijah Risley (1787–1870), American politician
Elijah Sterling Clack Robertson (1820–1879), American settler
Elijah Frink Rockwell (1809–1888), American minister
Elijah Round (1882–??), English footballer

S
Elijah Sandham (1875–1944), English politician
Elijah Schik (1795–1876), Lithuanian rabbi
Elijah Sells (1814–1897), American military officer
Elijah Watt Sells (1858–1924), American accountant
Elijah Seymour (born 1998), Caymanian footballer
Elijah Mattison Sharp (1832–1891), American politician
Elijah Shaw, American bodyguard
Elijah B. Sherman (1832–1910), American lawyer
Elijah Siegler, American professor
Elijah Smith (disambiguation), multiple people
Elijah Sogomo (born 1954), Kenyan sprinter
Elijah ben Solomon Abraham ha-Kohen (??–1729), Greek preacher
Elijah Spencer (1775–1852), American politician
Elijah Edmund Spencer (1846–1919), Canadian politician
Elijah Spira (1660–1712), Czech rabbi
Elijah Stansbury Jr. (1791–1883), American politician
Elijah Steele (1817–1883), American attorney
Elijah Stephens (1804–1887), American pioneer
Elijah Stewart (born 1995), American basketball player
Elijah B. Stoddard (1826–1903), American politician
Elijah Sullivan (born 1997), American football player
Elijah K. Sumbeiywo (??–2012), Kenyan politician

T
Elijah D. Taft (1819–1915), American army officer
Elijah Tamboo (born 1993), Seychellois footballer
Elijah Tana (born 1975), Zambian footballer
Elijah Taylor (rugby league) (born 1990), New Zealand rugby union footballer
Elijah Taylor (Australian footballer) (born 2001), Australian footballer
Elijah Thomas (born 1996), American basketball player
Elijah Thurmon (born 1978), American football player
Elijah Tillery (born 1957), American boxer
Elijah Tsatas (born 2004), Australian footballer

U
Elijah E. Unger (1857–1903), American accountant

V
Elijah Vance (1801–1871), American politician

W
Elijah Wadsworth (1747–1817), American military officer
Elijah Wald (born 1959), American guitarist
Elijah Walton (1832–1880), British landscapist
Elijah Ward (1816–1882), American politician
Elijah Ware (born 1983), Australian rules footballer
Elijah Waring (1787–1857), English writer
Elijah Wheatley (1885–1951), British jockey
Elijah White (1806–1879), American missionary
Elijah V. White (1832–1907), American general
Elijah Wilkinson (born 1995), American football player
Elijah Williams (disambiguation), multiple people
Elijah Wilson (born 1995), American basketball player
Elijah Nicholas Wilson (1842–1915), American pioneer
Elijah Winnington (born 2000), Australian swimmer
Elijah Wolfson, American writer
Elijah Wood (born 1981), American actor
Elijah Wood (murderer) (1878–1913), American serial killer
Elijah Woods (politician) (1778–1820), American politician
Elijah H. Workman (1835–1906), American agriculturalist
Elijah Wynder (born 2003), American soccer player

Y
Elijah Lim Teck Yong (born 2001), Singaporean footballer

Fictional characters
Elijah Baley, a character in the novel series Robot
Elijah Mundo, a character in the television series CSI: Cyber
Elijah Kamski, a character from the video game Detroit: Become Human
Elijah Mikaelson, a character from the television series The Vampire Diaries and its spin-off show The Originals

See also
Eliahu, a page for people with the name "Eliahu"
Elias, a page for people with the name "Elias"

References

Hebrew masculine given names
Theophoric names
Modern names of Hebrew origin
English masculine given names